Enfield Cricket Club is a cricket club in the Lancashire League, which plays its home games at Dill Hall Lane in Accrington. For the 2011 season its captain is Adam Bracewell, and its professional is Werner Coetsee of South Africa. The club has won the league on 5 occasions and the cup on 4. It has employed professionals including Clyde Walcott, Sylvester Clarke and Damien Fleming.

Honours
1st League Winners - 5 - 1909, 1943, 1968, 1971, 1977
Worsley Cup Winners - 4 - 1978, 1979, 1989, 1991
20/20 Cup - 1 - 2007
Ron Singleton Colne Trophy - 1 - 2016
2nd XI League Winners - 6 - 1901, 1939, 1952, 1978, 1985, 1986
2nd XI (Lancashire Telegraph) Cup Winners - 1 - 1988
3rd XI League Winners - 5 - 1981, 1983, 1991, 2010, 2012

References

External links
Official site
Enfield CC at lancashireleague.com

Lancashire League cricket clubs
Accrington
Sport in Hyndburn